Remco Torken (born 3 January 1972 in the Netherlands) is a Dutch retired footballer.

References

Dutch footballers
Association football forwards
Living people
1972 births
ADO Den Haag players
Helmond Sport players
CP Mérida footballers
VVV-Venlo players
K.S.C. Lokeren Oost-Vlaanderen players
K.S.K. Beveren players
Ter Leede players